The Society are an English gothic rock band, formed in Barnsley in 2014 after Paul Gilmartin, Martin Roberts and David Whitaker split from the reformed version of their previous band (see separate article, below). The current lineup is Jonathan Cridford (vocals), Elliot Wheeler (guitar), Darran Guy (keyboards), Ade Clark (bass guitar) and Paul Gilmartin (drums). Jonathan Cridford replaced Brian Jay in 2016. J. Cridford left after his last show with the band at the Gotham Sounds Fest in Germany. Paul Gregory of Expelaiers and 3,000 Revs replaced him on vocals. More guitar was added to the line up with the inclusion of David Wolfenden from Red Lorry Yellow Lorry. This line up opened the new version of Whitby Goth Weekend, now called Tomorrow's Ghost, in November 2018.

Background

First incarnation 
(see separate article The Danse Society)

Reformation 
Paul Gilmartin, after leaving The Danse Society in January 2014, recruited a strong male vocal, initially provided by Brian Jay, which proved popular with fans old and new as well as live audiences. The live band also began to take shape with the recruitment of Darran Guy on keyboards, Ade Clarke on bass and Elliott Wheeler on guitar.

Paul Gilmartin's album Reincarnated, featuring some early songs and many new ones, with lyrics by Gilmartin and scored by the band, was released in 2015.

While this incarnation of the band gained momentum, extensively touring the UK and Europe, playing alongside such bands as Balaam And The Angel, Chameleons Vox, Spear Of Destiny and Theatre Of Hate, a legal battle started for the sole usage of the band name.

During 2016, Brian Jay stepped aside to allow a new frontman, Jonathan "J" Cridford, to join the band. The "Reincarnated" tour continued, but as the tour drew to a close, the decision was made to change the band name, as Paul Gilmartin had lost the legal case against The Danse Society to gain the band name.

Future
At the start of 2017, "The Society" was born, in order to deliver Paul Gilmartin's legacy of the Danse Society's back catalogue of songs, as well as recording and performing new material. The band self-released a four-track EP, Night Ship in November 2017, to coincide with their tour supporting The Eden House. The mini-gatefold CD sold out its initial run quickly, and was well reviewed.

References

External links 
 

Intellectual Property decision results 

English post-punk music groups
Musical groups established in 1981
Musical groups disestablished in 1987
Musical groups reestablished in 2011
Musical groups disestablished in 2014
English gothic rock groups
English new wave musical groups
British dark wave musical groups
1981 establishments in England